Mauricio Hernán Díaz Castro (born August 7, 1968) is a retired long-distance runner from Chile. He represented his native country at the 2000 Summer Olympics in Sydney, Australia. On September 22, he achieved his personal best performance there in the men's 10,000 metres, finishing at a time of 28:05.61.

Achievements

External links
 
 

1968 births
Living people
Chilean male long-distance runners
Athletes (track and field) at the 2000 Summer Olympics
Athletes (track and field) at the 1999 Pan American Games
Athletes (track and field) at the 2003 Pan American Games
Olympic athletes of Chile
Pan American Games competitors for Chile